(1576–1643) was a Japanese wealthy merchant of the early Edo period. His real name was Okamoto Kotomasa. He was commonly called as Yodoya Saburōemon. He was the second head of the first "Yodoya" founded by the Okamoto family. As a merchant of Osaka, he was a prominent rice dealer who worked with various daimyōs. He is known as the developer of Nakanoshima.

References

This article is derived from corresponding content on the Japanese Wikipedia.

1576 births
1643 deaths
Japanese merchants
15th-century Japanese people
15th-century merchants
16th-century Japanese businesspeople